A Yekke (also Jecke) is a Jew of German-speaking origin. German Jews are perceived in Israel as having attention to detail and punctuality.

Demography
The wave of immigration to British Mandatory Palestine in the 1930s and 1940s known as the Fifth Aliyah had a large proportion of Yekkes, around 25% (55 000 immigrants). Many of them settled in the vicinity of Ben Yehuda Street in Tel Aviv, leading to the nickname "Ben Yehuda Strasse." Their struggle to master Hebrew produced a dialect known as "Yekkish." The Ben Yehuda Strasse Dictionary: A Dictionary of Spoken Yekkish in the Land of Israel, published in 2012, documents this language.

A significant community escaped Frankfurt after Kristallnacht, and relocated to the Washington Heights neighborhood of New York City, where they still have a synagogue, Khal Adath Jeshurun, which punctiliously adheres to the Yekkish liturgical text, rituals, and melodies.

See also

List of German Jews
Chuts
History of the Jews in Germany

References

Further reading

External links
 Machon Moreshes Ashkenaz
 The American Yekkes (Yisrael Kashkin, 2016)
 K'hal Adas Yeshurun of Jerusalem Nusach Project

Ashkenazi Jews topics
Jewish Austrian history
Jewish German history
Jewish Luxembourgian history
Jewish Swiss history
 
Yiddish words and phrases